Ardi Warsidi  is an Indonesian football defender who played for Indonesia in the 2000 Asian Cup. He also played for Persija Jakarta.

External links
11v11 Profile

1979 births
Living people
Indonesian footballers
Indonesia international footballers
Association football defenders
People from Jepara
Sportspeople from Central Java